Apostelamt Jesu Christi (Apostle Ministry of Jesus Christ) is a German Christian church with historical roots in the Catholic Apostolic Church and the New Apostolic Church. It is part of the religious movement called Irvingism.

History
In 1902 an Elder of the Apostolic Mission Church (later known as the New Apostolic Church), Julius Fischer, came into conflict with the Chief Apostle Friedrich Krebs on matters of doctrine. According to Fischer, Jesus Christ has already returned in the re-established Apostle office and there was no future second coming. Krebs removed Fischer from office. Fischer and his followers formed the Apostelamt Juda. On 2 May 1902 Fischer was ordained as the first Apostle of this church.

After the death of Fischer in 1922 a group led by Hermann Krūger formed the breakaway group known as Apostelamt Simeon in Jacob's geslacht.

In 1933 this group along with Apostelamt Juda was banned by the Nazi Germany regime of Adolf Hitler. The church was seen by the Nazi regime as a socialist group. The church's beliefs on prophecy also made it illegal.

In 1947 the church regrouped under the leadership of Albert Trubach as Apostelamt Jesu Christi.

From the early 1990s there was an ecumenical bond between Apostelamt Jesu Christi and the South African Old Apostolic Church.

In mid-2006 four Apostles (Jorg Stohwasser, Ingolf Schultz, Uwe Jacob and Hans-Georg Richter) and their followers left Apostelamt Jesu Christi to become part of the Old Apostolic Church.

References

External links
www.kirche-ajc.de (AJC – Kirche des öffentlichen Rechts)
www.apostelamt.de (Gemeinsamer Internetauftritt des AJC – Kirche des privaten Rechts und der Gemeinschaft der Apostel Jesu Christi, GdAJC)

Catholic Apostolic Church denominations
1902 establishments in Germany